The Mauritanian Women's Championship is the top flight of women's association football in Mauritania. It is the women's equivalent of the Super D1 for men, but is not professional. The competition is run by the Football Federation of Mauritania.

History
Women's football was born in Mauritania on 2007 with the organisation of the unofficial tournament that was won by team École feu Mini. On 2014, another tournament was held under the name of Tournoi pour la promotion du football féminin.

For the 2016–17 season, first edition of the Mauritanian Women's Championship started, an official women's competition run by the Mauritanian federation.

Champions
The list of champions and runners-up:

Most successful clubs

References

External links 
Women's Championship - ffrim.org
Mauritania - List of Women Champions - rsssf.com
women football

 
Women's association football leagues in Africa
Women
2016 establishments in Mauritania
Sports leagues established in 2016